Nasreen Munni Kabir (born 1950) is an India-born television producer, director and author based in the U.K. She is best known for producing an annual season of Indian films for the British terrestrial television channel Channel 4.

Her work includes the 46-part series Movie Mahal, In Search of Guru Dutt, Follow that Star (a profile of Amitabh Bachchan), and Channel 4 series such as How To Make It Big in Bollywood & The Inner and Outer World of Shah Rukh Khan.  She won the 1999 Women of Achievement Award in Arts & Culture in the UK and became a governor on the board of the British Film Institute in 2000, serving a six-year term.

Over the years, she has directed several documentaries and published 15 books on cinema, including five books featuring the dialogue of Indian celebrated classic films and book-length biographical conversations with personalities in the Hindi film industry, Javed Akhtar, Lata Mangeshkar, A.R. Rahman, Gulzar, and Waheeda Rehman. Her latest book is a biography of legendary tabla virtuoso Ustad Zakir Hussain

Early life and education
Born in Hyderabad, India, Kabir's parents moved to London when she was age three.  She did her master's in cinema studies.

Career
Kabir moved to Paris and lived there for 19 years, studying film and working as an assistant on various documentaries. She also worked with French film director Robert Bresson as his trainee assistant on the film FOUR NIGHTS OF A DREAMER. She also worked as a consultant with Pompidou Centre in Paris, where she organised two Indian film festivals in 1983/85. In 1982, she resettled in London where she began her current job as Channel 4 TV's consultant on Indian Films. In 1986, she directed and produced a 46-part television docu-series on Indian cinema titled Movie Mahal for Channel 4 TV UK. and other series on Hindi cinema.

In 2005, she produced a two-part documentary on Shahrukh Khan, The Inner and Outer World of Shah Rukh Khan. It featured the superstar's 2004 Temptations concert tour, the film contrasts Khan's "inner world" of family and daily life, with the "outer world" of his work. She continues to curate an annual season of Indian films for Channel 4 each year. She has also directed a six-part series for Channel 4 UK on the legendary playback singer Lata Mangeshkar called LATA IN HER OWN VOICE.

In April 2011, a book titled "A. R. Rahman The Spirit of Music" written based on the conversations with Nasreen Munni Kabir was released. Also in 2011, she produced Bismillah of Benares a documentary on shehnai maestro, Bismillah Khan. It was presented by A.R. Rahman's KM Musiq and distributed by Sony Music in India.

April 2014 saw the release of a book named 'Conversations with Waheeda Rehman' which was based on her conversations with Waheeda Rehman about the latter's life and work.

Personal life
She lives in London.

Filmography
 Movie Mahal (1986/88) 49-part TV series
 In Search of Guru Dutt (1989) 3-part
 The Inner and Outer World of Shah Rukh Khan (2005)
 Bismillah of Benares (2011)

Bibliography

References

External links 
  Biography of Nasreen Munni Kabir at British Film Institute
 

1950 births
Living people
Writers from Hyderabad, India
Indian emigrants to England
English Muslims
Indian documentary filmmakers
Indian social sciences writers
Indian film historians
Indian women historians
20th-century Indian historians
Indian women science writers
20th-century Indian women writers
20th-century Indian writers
20th-century Indian film directors
20th-century Indian women scientists
20th-century Indian scientists
Women writers from Telangana
Women documentary filmmakers
Writers from London
English documentary filmmakers
British social sciences writers
British film historians
British women historians
English science writers
20th-century British women writers
Film directors from London
English emigrants to France
Indian emigrants to France